Mehbubganj is a town in Faizabad district (now Ayodhya district) in the Indian state of Uttar Pradesh.

Nearby towns
 Goshainganj
 Amsin
 Tanda
 Eltefatganj
 Maya Bazar
 Rajesultanpur

References

Cities and towns in Faizabad district